Sripada Subrahmanya Sastry (1891–1961) was a Telugu writer from Andhra Pradesh. His predominant works include short stories, novels, literary essays. He also performed Avadhanam. He is called Adhunika Katha Chakravarthy (King of modern short stories) because of his contributions to Telugu literature. He translated entire Valmiki Ramayana into Telugu prose. He ran a magazine called Prabuddha Andhra for 9 years.

Early life 
Subrahmanya Sastry was born on 23 April 1891 in Polamuru, East Godavari district of Andhra Pradesh to a Brahmin family. His parents are Lakshmipati Somayajulu and Mahalakshmi Somidevamma demma. His father, a Vedic scholar did not allow him to study anything except the traditional Hindu scriptures in Sanskrit. He completed his traditional education according his father's wishes and later pursued formal education.

Works 
 Anubhavalu Jnapakalunu (Experiences and memories)
 Vadla Ginjalu
 Pullampeta Jaree cheera
 Veeraanganalu (1924)
 Arikaalla kinda mantalu
 Veera Puja

References 

1891 births
1961 deaths
Telugu writers
People from East Godavari district